Konráðs saga keisarasonar is a medieval Icelandic romance saga. In the assessment of its editor Otto J. Zitzelsberger, it is 'a fine specimen of an early indigenous riddarasaga that combines elements from native tradition with newer and more fashionable ones from the Continent'. He dates it to the early fourteenth century. Although seen as highly formulaic by Jürg Glauser, Heizmann and Péza have argued that the saga provides a sophisticated exploration of identity.

Synopsis

Kalinke and Mitchell summarise the saga thus:

With his foster-brother Róðbert (the son of an earl), Konráðr (son of the emperor of Saxland) who is outstanding in every respect except that he has not learned foreign languages, journeys to Miklagarðr to woo Mathilda, daughter of the king of Grikkland. Róðbert, who is skilled in foreign languages, is to speak for Konráðr, but impersonates him and sues for Mathilda's hand. Konráðr learns of the betrayal and with the advice of Mathilda—who has vowed to marry only the son of the emperor of Saxland—he embarks upon a series of dangerous exploits designed to convince the king of Grikkland of his identity. Finally, he succeeds in obtaining Mathilda as his bride.

The Earl Róðbert who is the villain of the saga also features as a villain in Þjalar-Jóns saga, making the sagas an interesting example of intertextual relationships within the romance-saga corpus.

Manuscripts

The 2013 survey by Alaric Hall identified the following manuscripts of the saga (giving the sigla used in Zitzelsberger's edition):

A (Holm perg 7 4to)
B (Holm perg 7 fol)
b (AM 118a/119a 8vo)
D (AM 180b fol)
E (Holm perg 6 4to)
F (AM 567 4to)
AM 179 fol
AM 181f fol
AM 524 4to
AM 529 4to
AM 585e 4to
Böðvar Kvaran MS V 4to
Fiske F75A125 8vo
Holm papp 46 fol
IB 102 8vo
IB 224 8vo
IB 277 4to
IBR 42 8vo
IBR 43 8vo
IBR 5-6 fol
IBR 59 4to
Johns Hopkins 9 4to
JS 407 8vo
JS 623 4to
JS 632 4to
JS 635 4to
JS 8 fol
Kall 614 4to
Lbs 1217 4to
Lbs 1509 4to
Lbs 152 4to
Lbs 1654 4to
Lbs 1687 8vo
Lbs 1785 4to
Lbs 2115 4to
Lbs 2462 4to
Lbs 272 fol
Lbs 3121 4to
Lbs 3933 8vo
Lbs 3944 4to
Lbs 4825 4to
Lbs 679 4to
Lbs 998 4to
Nks 3051 4to
Oslo fol 3562:13
Rask 31 4to
Winnipeg, Elizabeth Dafoe Library, ISDA JB3 6 8vo
Winnipeg, Elizabeth Dafoe Library, ISDA JB6 1 4to

Editions and translations

 [Gunnlaugur Þórðarson (ed.)]. 1859. Konráðs saga keisarasonar, er for til Ormalands. Copenhagen: Pall Sveinsson.
 Cederschiöld, Gustaf (ed.). 1884. Fornsögur Suðrlanda. Lund: Gleerup.
 Riddarasögur, ed. by Bjarni Vilhjálmsson, 6 vols (Reykjavík: Íslendingasagnaútgáfan, 1949-1951), III 269-344. (Normalised version of Cederschiöld's text.)
 Hunt, Jennifer Margaret. "The Major Text of Konráðs saga keisarasonar with a Thesaurus of Word Forms." M. Phil. Thesis, Univ. of London, 1972. (based on Stockholm Perg. 4:o nr 7; Perg. fol. nr 7; Perg. 4:o nr 6.)
 Zitzelsberger, Otto, 'Konráðs saga keisarasonar', Seminar for Germanic Philology Yearbook (1980), 38-67 (translation)
 Zitzelsberger, Otto J. (ed.). 1987. Konráðs saga keisarasonar. American University Studies, Series I: Germanic Languages and Literature, 63. New York: Lang.

References

Chivalric sagas
Icelandic literature
Old Norse literature